María José Gaidano (born 25 March 1973) is an Argentine tennis coach and former professional tennis player.

She was born in Buenos Aires and played professionally from 1992 to 2000. Gaidona represented Argentina in the Fed Cup tournament in 1997.

WTA career finals

Doubles 3 (2 titles, 1 runner-up)

ITF finals

Singles (1–4)

Doubles (2–4)

References

External links
 
 
 

Living people
1973 births
Argentine female tennis players
Argentine tennis coaches
Tennis players from Buenos Aires
20th-century Argentine women